"Children of the Night" is a composition by Wayne Shorter, recorded by Art Blakey & the Jazz Messengers and  released on Mosaic in 1961.

1961 songs